Fazal Ahmad Manawi is a politician, an electoral expert, and an Islamic scholar.

A judge by profession, Manawi has served as a member and later as chairperson of the Independent Election Commission (2009-2013). In post-2001 administrations, he had held some senior government positions, including deputy chief justice. During his tenure as chairperson of the election commission, Manawi had successfully managed the post-election crises.

For his leadership, his national and international colleagues have admired him. In 2014, as Senior Electoral Advisor to then candidate Dr. Abdullah Abdullah, played an instrumental role in shaping the parameters of June 2014 runoff's recount and audit.

A master of Islamic Law, Manawi has also served as instructor and guest lecturer at various national universities, including Kabul University. Fluent in Arabic and Persian, Manawi has written many academic articles and participated in international panels on Sharia, moderation, democracy, and election. A former deputy for the Ulema Council of Afghanistan, Manawi remains an authority among moderate Islamic scholars in the country.

References

Living people
Afghan judges
Afghan Tajik people
Afghan politicians
Year of birth missing (living people)